Young Liberals is the youth and student organisation of the British Liberal Democrats. Membership is automatic for members of the Liberal Democrats aged 25 and under, whilst those between the ages of 26 - 30 are able to opt-in 
free of charge. It organises a number of fringe events at the Liberal Democrat Conference, which is held twice each year.

Young Liberals exists to campaign on issues affecting young people and students, with branches across the UK. The organisation is run by young people and acts as a pressure group within the Liberal Democrats.

Social liberalism, economic liberalism, social justice, internationalism and pro-Europeanism are important components of the group's political philosophy.

The constitution of the Liberal Democrats requires an affiliated youth and student wing. Accordingly, Young Liberals is a Specified Associated Organisation (SAO) of the party. It is granted voting rights on various Liberal Democrat committees, such as the Party's Federal Board.

Young Liberals is affiliated to both the International Federation of Liberal and Radical Youth (IFLRY) and European Liberal Youth. Its predecessors include Liberal Youth, founded in 2008, and Liberal Democrat Youth & Students, founded in 1990. The earliest organisations were the National League of Young Liberals (NLYL), founded in 1903 and the Union of Liberal Students (ULS), founded in 1920.

Organisation and structure

Federal organisation
Young Liberals is the main party, organised in Great Britain on a federal basis, comprising Welsh Young Liberals in Wales, Scottish Young Liberals in Scotland and English Young Liberals in England.

Executive
The federal organisation of Young Liberals organises liaisons with Liberal Democrats and affiliated organisations. The Federal Executive (current positions: Chair, Vice-Chair, Events Officer, Campaigns Officer, Communications Officer, Finance Officer, International Officer, Policy Officer, Membership Development Officer, Accessibility, Diversity and Standards Officer and Non Portfolio Officer,) operates alongside committees for Conferences, Policy and International affairs. These committees, barring ex officio members such as representatives from state organisations and delegates from the executive, are elected by the Young Liberals membership via an all-member ballot, terms beginning on 1 November and are responsible to Conference. The English, Scottish and Welsh representatives are elected by the memberships of the state organisations - English Young Liberals, Scottish Young Liberals and Welsh Young Liberals.

Honorary roles
There is an Honorary President and six Honorary Vice-Presidents of the organisation, who are elected by the membership to work alongside the executive to support the organisation, advise and often act as a form of institutional memory as well as give the Executive guidance and to act as spokespeople within the wider party.

Committees

In addition to the Executive, there are six committees which are responsible for the administration and implementation of its area, working alongside the executive. Committees are chaired by the Officer that is responsible for that area, for example the Policy Officer chairs the Policy Committee, and the other members of the committee are made up of members elected by the membership alongside the Officers and, with the exception of the International Committee and Diversity Committee, representatives from each of the three state organisations.

Campaigns Committee

Events Committee

Policy Committee

International Congress Delegates Committee

Communications Committee

Diversity Committee

Branches
Outside of universities, Young Liberals eschews a formal, hierarchical branch structure, instead encouraging members to organise themselves and to use their local Liberal Democrat Party for financial affairs. Active members communicate with their local Youth Chair, who liaises with the parent party's representatives and with the federal Young Liberals executive. In this way the activities of young and student members remain formally independent from but closely engaged with the Liberal Democrats.

Young Liberals has had an active branch in Northern Ireland since 2010, under the name of Liberal Youth Northern Ireland, which operates as the youth branch of the Northern Ireland Liberal Democrats. Since 2014 it has become an official branch of Young Liberals, though for administrative purposes it is a branch of the English Young Liberals rather than a separate state branch. Liberal Youth Northern Ireland maintains a close working relationship with Alliance Youth, the youth wing of the Alliance Party.

Conferences

The federal Conference is the sovereign body of the Young Liberals and has power to determine policy and direction. The federal Young Liberals usually hosts two conferences a year, a conference in the Winter and a training weekend known as 'Activate' in the Summer, which also acts as the constitutionally mandated Annual General Meeting. At conferences policy motions which shape YL policy and amendments to the organisations constitution are debated, alongside training and speaker sessions.

In addition, during each conference there is an Executive Scrutiny session, whereby members of the executive submit reports to conference on their activities and actions in their job. After each report motions on officers are debated, wherein any member can submit a Motion of commendation, Motion of censure or Motion of no confidence in an officer. Motions of commendation and censure are non-binding opinions of conference passed by a simple majority, expressing either positive or negative opinion on the actions of an officer. Motions of no confidence are binding motions which if passed have the effect of removing an officer from their position and require a two thirds majority in order to pass.

All Conferences following Manchester 2021, the first in person conference following the COVID-19 pandemic, are held as hybrid conferences. Hybrid conferences allow members to join in debates via Confera, an in-house developed and bespoke software package (and mobile app) which allows hybrid participation and voting in democratic events.

Conference locations

Special Conferences
In addition to the two ordinary Conferences the Young Liberals may also hold additional "Special Conferences". The Special Conferences require a requisition submitted to the Young Liberals Federal Executive signed by 40 full members, including at least 4 members of each State Organisation. The Special Conferences debates business specified in the requisition, although additional business may be taken at the discretion of the Executive.

The threshold of a Special Conference used to be significantly higher, standing at 200 members, however with the success of Online Conferences it was lowered as they could be held online with ease.

History

Liberal Democrat mergers
The Liberal Party and the SDP each had separate student and youth wings, including the Young Liberals and the Young Social Democrats until their merger in 1988. These merged in England to form the Student Liberal Democrats and the Young Liberal Democrats of England. In Scotland, there was a separate Scottish Young Liberal Democrats (which also included students of all ages). Liberal Democrat Youth and Students was itself created in 1993 from a merger of the Student Liberal Democrats  and the Young Liberal Democrats of England who had shared many resources in the run-up.  The merger talks were overseen by a committee which included Sarah Gurling, who later married the late Charles Kennedy. LDYS reorganised into a federal structure in 2000 and then admitted Scottish Young Liberal Democrats as its Scottish federal unit in 2002 - forming a single GB-wide organisation for the first time since the combined ULS-NLYL committees of the 1970s.

The organisation was then known as Liberal Democrat Youth and Students (LDYS). Spring 2008 saw LDYS renamed as Liberal Youth, at an event hosted by the Liberal Democrat leader, Nick Clegg. Liberal Youth is the successor organisation to all the youth and student wings of the Liberal Democrats, the Liberal Party and the Social Democratic Party, including the Union of Liberal Students, the National League of Young Liberals, (the Liberal party's youth wings), the Young Social Democrats and Students for Social Democracy (the youth and student wings of the Social Democratic Party).

List of chairs

See also
 English Young Liberals – English wing of Young Liberals
 Scottish Young Liberals – Scottish wing of Young Liberals
 Welsh Young Liberals – Welsh wing of Young Liberals
 Liberal Democrat Conference
 Liberal Reform
 Social Liberal Forum
 Cambridge University Liberal Association
 Oxford University Liberal Democrats
 Young Labour
 Young Conservatives

Notes

References

Organisation of the Liberal Democrats (UK)
Organisations associated with the Liberal Democrats (UK)
Political organisations based in London
Liberals
Youth wings of liberal parties